Distance is the third studio album by Battery, released in 1996 by COP International.

Track listing

Notes
 Tracks 14–19 consist of a few seconds of silence each.

Personnel 
Adapted from the Distance liner notes.

Battery
 Maria Azevedo – lead vocals, instruments
 Shawn Brice – instruments, production, engineering, mixing
 Evan Sornstein – instruments

Additional musicians
 Darren Johnson – backing vocals (1)
 Kim Xn – effects (6)

Production and design
 Curium Design – photography, design
 Christian Petke – production, engineering, mixing, backing vocals (3)
 Stefan Noltemeyer – mastering

Release history

References

External links 
 Aftermath at Discogs (list of releases)

1996 albums
COP International albums
Battery (electro-industrial band) albums